This is a list of lists, grouped by type of astronomical object.

Solar System 

 List of Solar System objects
 List of gravitationally rounded objects of the Solar System
 List of Solar System objects most distant from the Sun
 List of Solar System objects by size
 Lists of geological features of the Solar System
 List of natural satellites (moons)
 Lists of small Solar System bodies
 Lists of comets
 List of meteor showers

 Minor planets
 List of minor planets
 List of exceptional asteroids
 List of minor planet moons
 List of damocloids
 List of centaurs (small Solar System bodies)
 List of trans-Neptunian objects
 List of unnumbered minor planets
 List of dwarf planets
 List of possible dwarf planets

Exoplanets and  brown dwarfs 
 Lists of planets
 Lists of exoplanets
 List of largest exoplanets
 List of brown dwarfs

Stars 
Lists of stars
List of nearest stars and brown dwarfs
List of brightest stars
List of hottest stars
List of nearest bright stars
List of most luminous stars
List of most massive stars
List of largest known stars
List of smallest stars
List of oldest stars
List of stars with proplyds
List of variable stars
List of semiregular variable stars
List of stars that dim oddly
List of X-ray pulsars
List of brown dwarfs
List of supernovae
List of supernova remnants
List of gamma-ray bursts
List of white dwarfs

Star constellations 
Lists of constellations
Lists of stars by constellation
List of constellations by area
List of IAU designated constellations

Star clusters 

 List of open clusters
 List of stellar streams
List of nearby stellar associations and moving groups

Nebulae 
 Lists of nebulae
 List of dark nebulae
 List of diffuse nebulae
 List of planetary nebulae
 List of protoplanetary nebulae
 List of largest nebulae

Galaxies 
 Lists of galaxies
 List of galaxies
 List of largest galaxies
 List of galaxies with richest globular cluster systems
 List of nearest galaxies
 List of galaxies named after people
 List of spiral galaxies
 List of polar-ring galaxies
 List of ring galaxies
 List of quasars

 Satellite galaxies
 List of satellite galaxies of the Milky Way
 List of Andromeda's satellite galaxies
 List of Triangulum's suspected satellite galaxies

Galaxy groups and clusters 
 List of galaxy groups and clusters
 List of Abell clusters
 List of galaxy superclusters
 List of galaxy filaments
 List of large quasar groups

Black holes 
 Lists of black holes
 List of black holes
 List of most massive black holes
 List of nearest known black holes

Other lists 
 List of voids
 List of largest voids
 List of largest cosmic structures
 List of the most distant astronomical objects
 List of most massive neutron stars
 List of multiplanetary systems

Astronomical catalogues 
List of astronomical catalogues
List of Messier objects
List of NGC objects
List of NGC objects (1-1000) 
List of NGC objects (1001-2000) 
List of NGC objects (2001-3000) 
List of NGC objects (3001-4000) 
List of NGC objects (4001-5000) 
List of NGC objects (5001-6000) 
List of NGC objects (6001-7000) 
List of NGC objects (7001-7840)

Map of astronomical objects

See also 
 Lists of astronauts
 List of government space agencies
 List of planetariums
 Lists of space scientists
 Lists of spacecraft